Jayme Dickman (born July 30, 1977, in South Bend, Indiana) is an American Olympic shooter. She has competed in numerous international competitions in women's air rifle and .22 rifle. She attended the 2000 Summer Olympic Games, representing the United States.

References

American female sport shooters
ISSF rifle shooters
Shooters at the 2000 Summer Olympics
Olympic shooters of the United States
Living people
1977 births
People from South Bend, Indiana
Shooters at the 1999 Pan American Games
Pan American Games medalists in shooting
Pan American Games gold medalists for the United States
Medalists at the 1999 Pan American Games
21st-century American women
20th-century American women